David Apatu Plange (born 24 July 1965) is an English former professional rugby league footballer who played in the 1980s and 1990s, and coached in the 1990s and 2000s.

Background
David Plange was born in Hull, East Riding of Yorkshire, England. His father came to Hull from Ghana to study law and met David's mother there.

Playing career

International honours
David Plange won a cap for Great Britain while at Castleford in 1988 against France, and represented Great Britain while at Castleford in 1988 against Rest of the World.

Challenge Cup Final appearances
David Plange played , i.e. number 2, in Castleford's 15-14 victory over Hull Kingston Rovers in the 1986 Challenge Cup Final during the 1985–86 season at Wembley Stadium, London on Saturday 3 May 1986.

County Cup Final appearances
David Plange played , i.e. number 2, in Castleford's 18-22 defeat by Hull Kingston Rovers in the 1985 Yorkshire County Cup Final during the 1985–86 season at Headingley Rugby Stadium, Leeds on Sunday 27 October 1985, played  in the 31-24 victory over Hull F.C. in the 1986 Yorkshire County Cup Final during the 1986–87 season at Headingley Rugby Stadium, Leeds on Saturday 11 October 1986, played  and scored a try in the 12-12 draw with Bradford Northern in the 1987 Yorkshire County Cup Final during the 1987–88 season at Headingley Rugby Stadium, Leeds on Saturday 17 October 1987, played  in the 2-11 defeat by Bradford Northern in the 1987 Yorkshire County Cup Final replay during the 1987–88 season at Elland Road, Leeds on Saturday 31 October 1987, played  in the 12-33 defeat by Leeds in the 1988 Yorkshire County Cup Final during the 1988–89 season at Elland Road, Leeds on Sunday 16 October 1988, and played , i.e. number 5, and scored a try in the 11-8 victory over Wakefield Trinity in the 1990 Yorkshire County Cup Final during the 1990–91 season at Elland Road, Leeds on Sunday 23 September 1990.

Post-rugby career
Plange is the owner and chief pilot of Alpha2Bravo, a worldwide aircraft delivery service.

References

External links
!Great Britain Statistics at englandrl.co.uk (statistics currently missing due to not having appeared for both Great Britain, and England)
 Silk Cut Challenge Cup Final - Castleford v Hull Kingston Rovers
Plange is the man
Cullen takes up Wolves post
Profile at linkedin.com

1965 births
Living people
Black British sportspeople
Castleford Tigers players
Doncaster R.L.F.C. players
English rugby league coaches
English rugby league players
Great Britain national rugby league team players
Hull Kingston Rovers players
Hunslet R.L.F.C. coaches
Hunslet R.L.F.C. players
Rugby league wingers
Sheffield Eagles (1984) players
Rugby league players from Kingston upon Hull
Warrington Wolves coaches